The Eastern Romance languages developed from the Proto-Romanian language, which in turn developed from the Vulgar Latin spoken in a region of the Balkans which has not yet been exactly determined, but is generally agreed to have been a region north of the Jireček Line.
 

That there was language contact between Latin or Vulgar Latin speakers and speakers of indigenous Paleo-Balkan languages in the area is a certainty; however, it is not known which Paleo-Balkan language or languages comprise the substratal influence in the Eastern Romance languages.

The substratal elements in the languages are mostly lexical items. Around 300 words are considered by many linguists to be of substratum origin. Including place-names and river-names, and most of the forms labelled as being of unknown etymology, the number of the substratum elements in Eastern Romance may surpass 500 basic roots. Linguistic research in recent years has increased the body of Eastern Romance words that may be considered indigenous.

In addition to vocabulary items, some other features of Eastern Romance, such as phonological features and elements of grammar (see Balkan sprachbund) may also be from Paleo-Balkan languages.

Lexical items
Older Romanian etymological dictionaries tended to assume a borrowing in many cases, usually from a Slavic language or from Hungarian, but etymological analysis may show that, in many cases, the direction of borrowing was from Romanian to the neighboring languages. The current Dicționar explicativ (DEX) published by the Romanian Academy continues to list many words as borrowings, though the work of other linguists (Sorin Olteanu, Sorin Paliga, Ivan Duridanov, et al.) may indicate that a number of these are in fact indigenous, from local Indo-European languages.

Though the substratum status of many Romanian words is not much disputed, their status as Dacian words is controversial, some more than others. There are no significant surviving written examples of the Dacian language, so it is difficult to verify in most cases whether a given Romanian word is actually from Dacian or not. Many linguists however favor a Dacian source for the Romanian substratum. Many of the Romanian substratum words have Albanian cognates, and if these words are in fact Dacian, it indicates that the Dacian language may have been on the same branch as Albanian.

The Bulgarian Thracologist Vladimir Georgiev helped develop the theory that the Romanian language has a Daco-Moesian language as its substrate, a language that had a number of features which distinguished it from the Thracian language spoken further south, across the Haemus range.

According to Romanian historian , there are supposedly over 160 Romanian words of Dacian origin, representing, together with derivates, 10% of the basic Romanian vocabulary.

Below is a list of Romanian words believed by early scholars to be of Dacian origin, which have also been attributed to other origins. The list does not include the Dacian plant names collected by Dioscorides and Pseudo-Apuleius, since these words were not retained in Romanian.
{| class="wikitable"
! Word / Name !! English !! Sources !! Notes – Alternative etymologies
|-
| abeș || really, for sure! || Hasdeu, Vraciu, Paliga || dialectal Banat; a+beș < IE *bhend(s)- 'to bind', cf. Albanian besë 'word of honor; faith', besabesë 'on my honor!'
|-
|Abud
|Abud, village in Mureș County
|Paliga
|related to Thracian Aba, Abantes, Abro-lebas. Cf. Romanian Abrud, abur, Pre-Indo-European ultimately from *AB- 'elevated, prominent'
|-
| abur(e) || steam, vapour || Hasdeu, Russu (Alb.), Vraciu,
Paliga
| Aromanian abur(ã); cf. Albanian avull Proto-Albanian *abulā 'steam, vapour'; cf. Romanian boare. Ultimately from Pre-Indo-European *AB- 'prominence, elevation'
|-
|aburca
|'to climb up'
|Paliga
|Prefix ab (see above) + urca: ultimately from Pre-Indo-European *OR- / *UR- 'big, huge, giant' related with Greek ouranizo 'to go up, to climb' derived from Ouranos 'sky'.
|-
|ad-, at-
|
|Paliga
|Pre-Indo-European, spread across whole Europe. Inherited via Thracian.
|-
|adaru
|I make; I set up, I set an ornament
|Paliga
|Aromanian; from Indo-European *der-, dra- 'to work'; cf. Greek δράω, Lithuanian daraù, Latvian darît 'to make'
|-
|adulmeca
|'to sniff, to smell'
|Paliga
|probably *ad-ul-m-ec-a. Substatum root -ulm- related to olm '''smell'; derivative suffix -ec also indigenous. Similar construction to adămană, ademeni. The Thracian root must be *olm-, *ulm- 'smell, to smell; to sniff; to track an animal for hunt' or dul-, dol- 'dog', see dulău, dolcă.
|-
|ag-|archaic 'to get to a thorn'
|Paliga
|Cf. agănău, agăța. Related to Thracian names Aga-thyr-soi, Aeg-issus (Tulcea). agăța is seemingly derived from the same root.
|-
|Agaua|Agaua village, Brăila county
|Paliga
|related to Agnita, Agăș, Agriș/agriș, cf. Agay, Provence, and Aigai, Greece. See ag-.|-
|agănău|a kind of folk dance
|Paliga
|related to root ag-.
|-
|Agăș|Agăș, Bacău county, Bihor county
|Paliga
|Today extinct. The village in Bihor is near a hill called Acățel which can be used to reject an etymology from agas 'crossroad, branched out'. Cf. Thracian Aegissus; the spelling -ss- might stand for an original š in Thracian. Also place names Egeria, Egirca, Egeta, Aegeta and in Hungary Ágasvár seems related, in which case it could be Pre-Magyar.
|-
| aghiuță || devil || Hasdeu || from Greek ágios (άγιος) 'holy' + -uță.Academia Română, Institutul de Lingvistică din București, Dicționarul limbii române moderne (Editura Academiei, 1958).
|-
|Agnita|Agnita, Serbia
|Paliga
|cf. Thracian, Ancient Greek Aegitna, Aigaios
|-
|amurg, -uri|'sunset'
|Paliga
|related to the name of the Greek island Amorgós, and amorgís, -ídos textile plant (Chantraine). Probably from Preie. *AM-, *AN-|-
| andrea || knitting needle || Russu || Muntenian/Transylvanian undrea; from Andrea, Undrea 'December', from Greek Andréas 'St. Andrew's Day' (Nov. 30th); from the tradition of knitting socks on St. Andrew's Day. Similar to Alb. shëndreu 'November', after Shën Ndreu 'St. Andrew'.
|-
| argea || loom || Hasdeu, Russu (Alb.), Vraciu || plural argele; from Greek argaleiós; also Albanian dial. argali 'small, wooden loom' (< Gk)
|-
| baligă || dung, manure || Russu (Alb.) || Aromanian baligã, Megleno-Romanian balig, Istro-Romanian bålege; from Old Albanian baljëgë (modern bajgë, dial. balgë, balëg, balëgë); also Serbo-Croatian bȁlega (< Alb)
|-
| baltă || pool, puddle || Russu (Alb.) || Aromanian baltã, Megleno-Romanian baltă, Istro-Romanian bote; from Albanian baltë 'swamp'.
|-
| barză || stork (Ciconia ciconia) || Hasdeu, Russu, Vraciu, Olteanu || Oltenia bardăș, bardoș 'stork', Transylvanian/Aromanian/Megleno-Romanian bardzu 'white'; feminine of barz 'whitish (of birds)', from Albanian bardhë 'white', bardhosh, bardhash 'whitish'
|-
| bălaur, balaur || dragon, monster || Hasdeu, Russu (Alb.), Vraciu || from Serbo-Croatian blȁvor (variants blavur, blaor) 'scheltopusik', from Albanian bullar (var. buljar, bollar).
|-
| băga || to insert, thrust || Russu || Aromanian bagu 'to put', Megleno-Romanian bagari; from Byzantine Greek bázo (βάζω) 'to put in or on, set down'
|-
| băl, bălan, bălaș || fair-haired, blond (person); white-haired (animal) || Hasdeu || from Albanian bal(ë) 'white-haired; starred forehead', balosh, balash 'white-marked, piebald; dappled; hoary, white-haired'
|-
| bâr || call to a sheep || Vraciu || from Albanian berr 'sheep or goat; small livestock'; cf. Czech beran 'ram', Polish/Ukrainian/Russian baran (< Romanian); Canavese berro 'ram', Piemontese bero 'id.' (< Alb)
|-
| brad || fir (Abies) || Hasdeu, Russu (Alb.), Olteanu || Aromanian brad; from Proto-Albanian *brada (modern bredh).
|-
| brânză || cheese || Hasdeu, Russu, Vraciu || Aromanian brãndzã, Megleno-Romanian brǫnză; from Albanian brëndës 'intestines; rennet bag (made of stomach)', identical to rânză (< rrëndës) (see below); Romanian lent Transylvanian German Pränz, Slovak/Polish bryndza, which gave Austrian Brimsen.Lazăr Șăineanu, Dicționar universal al limbii române (Craiova: Scrisul Românesc, 1896). 
|-
| brâu || belt, waist || Russu (Alb.) || dialectal brân, colloquial brână, Aromanian brãnu, Megleno-Romanan brǫn, Istro-Romanian brĕne; from Old Albanian *bren (modern brez 'belt; waist', mbrej 'to buckle'); replaced Transylvanian/Bucovina balț 'loop, eye(let), ring (of iron)' (cf. Aromanian balțu), from Latin balteus 'belt'.
|-
| brusture || burdock (Arctium lappa) || Russu (Alb.) || Aromanian broshtur, brushturã; from Albanian brushtull 'heather'
|-
| bucura || to be glad || Russu (Alb.) || also bucuros 'glad'; from Albanian bukuroj 'to beautify', bukurosh 'beautiful', both from bukur 'nice, lovely'
|-
| bunget || dense, dark forest || Hasdeu, Russu (Alb.), Vraciu || from Albanian bung 'chestnut oak' + Romanian -et 'grove'.
|-
| burtă || belly, stomach || Russu || dialectal borț 'pregnant woman's belly'
|-
| buză || lip; edge || Russu (Alb.) || Aromanian budzã "lip; brim"; from Albanian buzë "lip; edge"
|-
|Buzău|Buzău, Buzău county
|Paliga
|Attested in antiquity as Μουσεος
|-
| cață || shepherd's rod, crook || Russu || also descăța "to unhook"; See acăța above.
|-
| căpușă || sheep ked (Melophagus ovinus) || Russu (Alb.) || from Albanian këpushë 'tick', derivative of kap 'to grip, snatch'
|-
| căpută || toe (of shoe); low boot || Russu (Alb.) || from Albanian këputë "sole (of shoe)", këpucë "shoe"; unrelated to Slavic kopyto "hoof" > Romanian copită|-
| cătun || hamlet || Russu (Alb.) || from Albanian katund (dial. katun, kotun) 'village; herdsmen community; widely spread-out village"
|-
| cioară || crow || Sala, Hasdeu, Vraciu || Aromanian cioarã, Megleno-Romanian čoară; from Old Albanian *corrë (mod. sorrë)
|-
| ciut || hornless, poll; one-horned || Russu (Alb.) || dialectal șut; from Slavic; cf. Bulgarian/Serbo-Croatian šut; also Albanian shyt 'hornless' (connected to "sutë" (a doe, female deer) (an Albanism in the other Balkan languages)
|-
| curma || to stop abruptly, interrupt || Russu (Alb.) || older curmez, from Byzantine Greek kormázein (κορμάζω); cf. Albanian kurmua|-
| curpăn || vine, twining stem || Russu (Alb.) || from Albanian kurpën, kurpër 'clematis', from kurp 'traveller's joy, old man's beard (Clematis vitalba)'; related to below.
|-
| cursă || trap, snare || Russu (Alb.), Olteanu || from Albanian kurth(ë), contraction of dial. kurpth, diminutive of kurp; related to above.
|-
| custură || blade, knife edge, knife || Russu || variants custure, cusutură, cuțitură, from cuțit "knife' + suffix -tură|-
| daș || ram (male sheep) || Russu (Alb.) || from Albanian dash|-
| doină || lamenting folksong || Hasdeu, Vraciu || Transylvanian daină; from Lithuanian dainà 'folksong' (cf. Latvian daĩn̨a), derivative of Proto-Baltic *deî- (cf. Latvian diêt, dìet 'to dance, hop; sing') 
|-
| droaie || crowd, multitude; a lot || Russu || back-formation from the plural droi, from Albanian droe, droje 'fear'; same sense development in Rom. groază 'horror' > o groază de 'a lot of'.
|-
|Dunăre|The Danube river
|Paliga
|Dac. *Dan-ar- cf. NFl Aar, Aare, NL Aarhus, O. Dan. aar 'a river'
|-
| fărâmă || crumb, morsel, bit || Russu (Alb.) || variant sfărâmă, Aromanian sãrmã; from Albanian thërrime, from ther 'to stab, slaughter, snip'
|-
| gard || fence || Russu (Alb.) || Istro-Romanian gård "wattle gate to a pen"; from Albanian gardh; unrelated to Slavic gradŭ > Alb gradë|-
| gata || ready, done || Russu (Alb.) || from Albanian gat(i) "ready", from gatuaj 'to ready, prepare; cook', from Slavic *gotovati; cf. Serbo-Croatian gotov "ready", Polish gotowy.
|-
| gălbează || liver rot (fasciolosis), sheep pox || Russu (Alb.) || variant călbează; from Albanian gëlbazë, këlbazë, klëbacë 'sheep pox', itself from the Albanian word "kalb" (to rot, to go bad) with a diminutive suffixe -zë, commonly seen in disease names. 
|-
| ghimpe || thorn || Russu (Alb.) || from Albanian gjemb (dialectal Tosk gjëmp, Arvanite gljimp, Gheg glëmp)
|-
| ghionoaie || woodpecker || Sala, Russu (Alb.) || dialectal ghionoi, ghin, Aromanian ǵionu 'tawny owl'; from Albanian gjon 'scops owl', from Gjon 'John'; Albanian also has qukapik 'woodpecker' (< qukë 'owl' + pik 'woodpecker')
|-
| ghiuj || gaffer, old fogey || Hasdeu, Vraciu || Aromanian ghiush; from Albanian gjysh "grandfather"
|-
| gordin || kind of grapes used in winemaking || Hasdeu || variants gordean, g(o)ardină, gorgan, gordan; from Russian gordina "currant"
|-
| grapă || harrow || Russu (Alb.) || from Albanian grep (var. grap) 'hook'.
|-
| gresie || sandstone, whetstone || Russu (Alb.) || Aromanian greasã; from Albanian gërresë (var. grresë) 'rasp, scraper; drawing knife', from gërryej 'to scrape, scour'
|-
| grumaz || neck || Russu (Alb.), NODEX || Aromanian grumadz, gurmadz; from Albanian gurmaz 'gaping maw, wide-open jaws; esophagus' (variants gurmac, grumas, gërmaz), itself from kurm 'trunk (of the body), torso' (> Romanian dial. curm 'short rope', curmei 'vine shoot')
|-
| grunz || lump, clod || Russu (Alb.) || variants (s)grunț, Aromanian grundã (plural grundz) 'lump', grundzã 'bran'; from Albanian krunde 'coarse bran; sawdust' (var. grundë), derivative of kruaj 'to scratch'
|-
| gudura || to fawn, cajole || Russu || from Albanian gudulis 'to tickle; pleasure'; unrelated to Romanian gâdila 'to tickle' (see above).
|-
| iazmă (Banat) || ugly and evil apparition, ghost || Hasdeu || western aiazmă, eastern agheazmă; from Greek agíasma (αγίασμα) 'holy water; sacred spring'.
|-
| întrema || to recover after illness or fatigue || Russu || variants întrăma, (Moldavia, Bucovina) întrarma, back-formation from destrăma 'unweave, unravel, break up'.
|-
| leagăn || cradle, swing || Russu || variants leangăn, leagănă; Istro-Romanian leagăr; back-formation of legăna "to rock, swing" (cf. Aromanian leagãnu "to swing", Megleno-Romanian legăn), from Byzantine Greek liknon "cradle"; likewise Albanian lëkund "to swing"
|-
| mal || lakeside shore, riverbank; coast || Sala, Hasdeu, Russu (Alb.), Vraciu || from Albanian mal "mountain"
|-
| maldac, măldac || a small load (of wood, hay, etc.) || Hasdeu || from Greek mandákis|-
| mazăre || pea (Pisum sativum) || Hasdeu, Russu (Alb.), Vraciu, Olteanu || Aromanian madzãre; also Romanian măzăriche 'vetch', Aromanian mãdziriclje; from Albanian modhull(ë) 'yellow vetchling', diminutive of modhë 'rye-grass, brome'
|-
| mânz || foal, colt || Russu (Alb.) || Aromanian mãndzu, Megleno-Romanian mǫndz; from Old Albanian manz (modern Tosk mëz, Gheg mâz). Also mânzat 'steer', from OAlb. *manzat (mod. Tosk mëzat, Gheg mâzat 'yearling calf; bullock').
|-
| măgură || hill, knoll || Sala, Russu (Alb.) || dialectal Romanian măgulă, Aromanian mãgulã; from Albanian magulë, a metathesis of gamulë; likewise Serbo-Croatian gòmila ~ mògila 'heap'.
|-
| mire || bridegroom || Hasdeu, Russu, Vraciu || from Albanian mirë 'good'; replaced Old Romanian măritu (still used in Muntenia).
|-
| moș || old man || Russu (Alb.) || back-formed from moașă 'midwife' (cf. Aromanian moashe, Megleno-Romanian moașă 'old woman'), from Albanian moshë 'age', moshëm 'old, aged'; replaced Old Romanian auș (still in Oltenia), from Latin avus.
|-
| mozoc || large shepherd dog || Hasdeu || variant mosoc|-
| mugure || bud || Russu (Alb.) || from Albanian mugull "bud, sprout"
|-
|Mureș|Mureș river
|Paliga
|Ancient Maris, from IE *māro, *māno 'wet' and related to Romanian a mura 'to pickle'
|-
| murg ||  dark-bay horse || Sala, Russu (Alb.) || Aromanian murgu, Megleno-Romanian murg; also amurg 'twilight, dusk'; from Albanian murg "dark".
|-
| mușat || handsome || Russu || Aromanian musheat, Megleno-Romanian/Istro-Romanian mușat; clipped form of *frumușat, from frumos|-
| noian || multitude, heap; (arch.) abyss, immense sea || Sala, Russu || from Albanian ujanë "ocean", from ujë "water"
|-
| păstaie || pod, capsule, hull || Russu (Alb.) || Aromanian pãstãlje; from Vulgar Latin pistālia, from pistāre "to pound"; or from Albanian bishtajë "pod, hull; string bean"
|-
| pârâu (pl. pâraie) || brook, creek || Russu (Alb.) || dial. (North) pârău, Megleno-Romanian păroi; from Albanian përrua (def.sg. përroi) 'torrent, rushing stream', from Bulgarian poroj (порой) 'torrent', from *po-rojĭ (cf. Macedonian roj (рој) 'swarm', Polish zdrój 'spring, waters').
|-
| păstra || to keep up || Russu || older păstrez; Aromanian spãstrescu, Megleno-Romanian păstres; from Greek pastrevo (παστρεύω) 'to clean, cleanse', from Byzantine Greek spastréuō; cf. Bulgarian pastrja (< Greek)
|-
|Proca|name of person
|Paliga
|related to Dac. NL Napoca|-
| pupăză  || hoopoe || Sala  || Aromanian pupãzã, Megleno-Romanian pupează; from Albanian pupëz(ë), diminutive of pupë, itself possibly from Latin upupa|-
| pururi || always, forever || Russu (Alb.) || variant purure, pururea; from d(e-a) pure(a)|-
| rânză || abomasum (rennet stomach) || Hasdeu, Russu (Alb.), Vraciu || Aromanian arãndzã 'rennet'; from Albanian rrëndës 'rennet'.
|-
| sâmbure || kernel; pip, core || Russu (Alb.), NODEX, Olteanu || dialectal simbure, sumbure, Aromanian sãmbure, sumbur; from Albanian sumbull "push button; bud"
|-
| scăpăra || to strike fire; sparkle, lighten || Russu (Alb.) || Aromanian ascãpirare, Megleno-Romanian scăpirari; from Albanian shkrep "to strike fire", shkrepës "flint"
|-
| scrum || ashes || Russu (Alb.) || older scrumb; from Albanian shkrumb; also Bulgarian скрум (< Romanian)
|-
| searbăd || insipid || Russu (Alb.), Olteanu || older sarbăd, Aromanian sarbit; from Albanian tharbët "sour" (standard thartë, dialectal tharptë)
|-
| spânz || purple hellebore || Russu (Alb.) || variants spânț, spunz, Aromanian spingiu; from Albanian shpendër (variants shpindër, spindër, spinër)
|-
| steregie || soot caked in a chimney; scum; dross, waste; wine tartar || Russu || variants stirigie, stirighie, etc.; from variants tereghie, tirghie, etc. "wine tartar", from Greek trugiá, blended with Serbo-Croatian striješ (Chakavian striš) "wine tartar"
|-
| sterp || barren, infertile || Russu (Alb.) || eastern stărp, Aromanian sterpu; from Byzantine Greek stérifos (στέριφος; mod. stérfos (στέρφος)); cf. Albanian shterpë, Slovene stirpa, Venetian sterpa (all < Gk).
|-
| strepede || cheese maggot (larva of the cheese fly, cheese skipper; Piophila casei) || Russu (Alb.) || Aromanian streapit "cheese mite", Megleno-Romanian strepij; from Albanian shtrep "maggot, larva"
|-
| strungă || sheepfold; narrow passage, canyon || Russu (Alb.), NODEX || from Albanian shtrungë 'milking enclosure', from shtroj 'to spread'
|-
| sugruma || to strangle, to burke || Russu || from sub "under" + grumaz "throat" (see above).
|-
| șir || row, line || Hasdeu, Russu || also șiră "spine"; from Greek sirá (σειρά) 'line, row; cord, rope'
|-
| șopârlă || wall lizard (Lacerta muralis) || Hasdeu, Russu (Alb.), Vraciu || variant șopirlă, Aromanian ciupilar (recent jabilu, șapic, japie); from Albanian zhapi (plural zhapinj) 'lizard' (var. xhapi, xhzpik).
|-
| traistă || bag || Hasdeu || older taistră, tainstră, traistră, Bassarabia/Maramarus straistă, Transylvanian straiță; cf. Albanian trastë, trajstë, strajcë.
|-
| țap || he-goat; buck || Russu (Alb.) || from Albanian cjap (var. cap, cqap, sqap).
|-
| țarc || pen, fold || Russu (Alb.), Olteanu || from Albanian thark (var. cark) 'enclosure (esp. for milking)'.
|-
| țumburuș || small, round knob, nub || Olteanu || older țâmburuș; from Albanian thumbull 'button; pin'; nearly identical to sâmbure (< sumbull) (see above).
|-
| urca || to mount, ascend; increase || Russu, Paliga|| Either from Vulgar Latin *oricāre, frequentative of orior "to rise" or ultimately from Pre-Indo-European *OR- / *UR- 'big, huge, giant' related with Greek ouranizo 'to go up, to climb' derived from Ouranos 'sky'.
|-
| urdă || ricotta || Hasdeu, Russu, Vraciu || from dialectal Albanian urdhë (standard udhos, dialectal urdhos)
|-
| vatră || hearth, fireplace; home || Hasdeu, Russu (Alb). || from Albanian vatër; also Serbian vatra "fire" (< Alb)
|-
| vătui || yearling kid (goat); hare || Russu (Alb.) || older vătuiu, Aromanian  vitulju, Megleno-Romanian vitul'u; from Byzantine Greek *vitoúlion (*βιτούλιον; modern Lefkada vitũli (βιτοῦλι)); also Albanian ftujë (Cham ftulë, Arbëresh vëtulë) 'female kid' (< ByzGk)
|-
| viezure || badger || Sala, Russu (Alb.), Olteanu || older viedzure, Aromanian yedzurã, yedzãre; from Albanian vjedhull, from vjedh "to steal"
|-
| zară || buttermilk || Russu || from *dzară, from Albanian dhallë; also Aromanian dhalã (recent loan; < Alb)
|-
| zburda || sport, frolic, frisk about || Russu || variant sburda; from Byzantine Greek spyrthizein 'to frolic, lark (of animals)'
|-
| zer || whey || Russu, Olteanu || older zăr, Aromanian dzãr, Moldavian/Banat/ dzăr masculine back-formation from zară (see above).
|-
| zgardă || dog collar || Russu (Alb.) || from Albanian shkardhë 'dog chain; (dial.) wicker gate in fence', from sh- + gardhë 'fence'.
|}

 The Notes column contains information found in various dictionaries. "Not in current use" indicates words not found in dictionaries of contemporary Romanian.
 The Sources column indicates the linguist(s) or the works who suggested including the words in the list:
"Sala": Marius Sala, De la latină la română (1998) 
"Hasdeu": Bogdan Petriceicu Hasdeu, Etymologicum Magnum Romaniae, 1894.
"Russu": , Limba traco-dacilor, Editura Științifică, 1967. The words that have been identified by I. I. Russu to have cognates in Albanian are marked with (Alb.).
"Vraciu": Ariton Vraciu, Limba daco-geților, Timișoara: Editura Facla, 1980.
"NODEX": Noul dicționar explicativ al limbii române [The New Dictionary of the Romanian Language], Litera Internațional, 2002. In this dictionary substratum words are labeled cuvînt autohton "native word".
"Olteanu": Sorin Olteanu, "The TDM Palatal".
"Ciorănescu": Alexandru Ciorănescu, Diccionario etimológico rumano, Tenerife: Universidad de la Laguna, 1958–1966.
Sorin Paliga, Etymological Lexicon of the Indigenous (Thracian) Elements in Romanian, Bucharest: Editura Evenimentul, 2006.

Other languages
There are also some Romanian substratum words in languages other than Romanian, these examples having entered via Romanian (Vlach) dialects. An example is vatră (home or hearth) which is found in Albanian, Serbo-Croatian, Carpathian highlander dialects of Polish and Ukrainian and other neighboring languages, though with modified meaning. Another one is Bryndza, a type of cheese made in Eastern Austria, Poland, the Czech Republic (Moravian Wallachia), Slovakia and Ukraine, the word being derived from the Romanian word for cheese (brânză).

 See also 
 Substrate in Romanian 
 Wiktionary: Romanian substratum words
 Romanian lexis
 Daco-Roman
 Daco-Romanian
 Vlachs

Notes

References

Further reading
 Dominte, Constantin. "Le mot régional daco-roumain 'tirş': une hypothèse étymologique concernant le substrat du rumain, en rapport avec le grec ancien". In: Balkan Studies Vol 27, No 2 (1986): 253-261.
 Bogdan Petriceicu Hasdeu. Columna lui Traian, 1876.
 Bogdan Petriceicu Hasdeu. Etymologicum Magnum Romaniae: Dicționarul limbei istorice și poporane a românilor, 3 vols. Bucharest: Socec şi Teclu, 1887–1895 (reprint ed. Grigore Brâncuș, Bucharest: Minerva, 1972–1976).
 Ion. I. Russu. Limba traco-dacilor, 2nd edn. Bucharest: Editura Științifică, 1967 (1st edn. Acad. Rep. pop. Romîne 1959; reprint Dacica 2009).
 Ion. I. Russu. Elemente autohtone în limba română: Substratul comun româno-albanez. Bucharest: Editura Academiei RSR, 1970 (reprint Dacica 2013).
 Ion. I. Russu. Etnogeneza românilor. Bucharest: Editura Științifică și Enciclopedică, 1981.
 Ariton Vraciu. Limba daco-geților. Timișoara: Editura Facla, 1980.
 Alexandru Ciorănescu. Diccionario etimológico rumano. 3 vols. La Laguna, Tenerife: Biblioteca Filológica, Universidad de la Laguna, 1958–1966 (reprint: Madrid: Gredos, 1966).
 Romanian translation: Dicționar etimologic român''. Translated by Tudora Șandru Mehedinți & Magdalena Popescu Marin. Bucharest: Saeculum, 2001 (in part available online at DEX online).
 George Pruteanu. "Limba traco-dacilor", transcript of a TV show broadcast March 25 and 26, 1996, on PRO TV; the transcript is followed by a "List of words considered by specialists as most probably belonging to the Dacian language".
 DEX online: a collection of Romanian dictionaries
Albanian <-> English Dictionary

Roman Dacia
History of the Romanian language
Dacian language
Linguistic strata